Rydalmere railway station, originally Victoria Road railway station, was a railway station in Sydney, Australia that was open between 1896 and 2020. It was located on the Carlingford line and served the suburb of Rydalmere. At the time of closure, Rydalmere station was served by Sydney Trains T6 Carlingford line services.

History
Rydalmere station opened on 20 April 1896 as Victoria Road. It was renamed Rydalmere on 1 August 1901. The station was originally located on the western side of the line. It was replaced by a new station on the eastern side over the former goods siding on 28 June 1993.

The Camellia to Carlingford section of the Carlingford railway line is being converted to light rail as part of the Parramatta Light Rail project with the line closed 5 January 2020.

The station and surrounding land were fully demolished in April 2020

Platforms & former services
At the time the station closed the platform had the following services:

Transport links
State Transit operated six routes via Rydalmere station:
500X: Hyde Park via to Parramatta station
521: Eastwood to Parramatta station
523: West Ryde station to Parramatta station
524: West Ryde station to Parramatta station via Melrose Park
525: Westfield Burwood to Parramatta station

Rydalmere station was served by one NightRide route:
N61: Carlingford station to Town Hall station

References

External links

Rydalmere station details Transport for NSW

Disused railway stations in Sydney
Railway stations in Australia opened in 1896
Railway stations closed in 2020
2020 disestablishments in Australia
City of Parramatta